is a terminal station on the Kintetsu Nagoya Line. It is connected to Nagoya Station (JR Central, Aonami Line, and Nagoya City Subway) and Meitetsu Nagoya Station (Nagoya Railroad).

Layout
The station has four bay platforms serving five tracks on the first basement.

Adjacent stations

References

Railway stations in Aichi Prefecture
Railway stations in Nagoya
Railway stations in Japan opened in 1938